Yalıhüyük is a town and district of Konya Province in the Central Anatolia region of Turkey. According to 2000 census, population of the district was 5,575 of whom 5,330 live in the town of Yalıhüyük. Gölcük Plateau is located in the district.

Notes

References

External links
 District municipality's official website 
 Local news portal of Yalıhüyük 
 Local Community portal of Yalıhüyük

Other links 
 Personality local website 

Populated places in Konya Province
Districts of Konya Province